Jaikel Medina (born 8 January 1992 in Costa Rica) is a Costa Rican footballer for Liga Nacional club Malacateco.

References

Costa Rican footballers
Living people
1992 births
Association football defenders
Association football midfielders
Deportivo Saprissa players